Misonne is a surname. Notable people with the surname include:

 Jacques Misonne (1892–1968), Belgian equestrian
 Léonard Misonne (1870–1943), Belgian photographer